Syed Khwaja Shams-ud-Din Ibrahim Yukpasi (born 760 AH, or AD 1358/1359), son of Khwaja Nasr-ud_Din Waleed, was a Sufi religious leader.

Family
He was born at Chisht in a family of Sadaat-i-Maudoodiya. He had two brothers, Khwaja Nizam-ud_Din Moudood and Khwaja Nuqr-ud-Din Shaal Pir Baba Moudood. The three brothers completed their education and Sufi training under the guidance and supervision of their father. It has been narrated that the descendants of Khwaja Sultan Maudood Chishti are not permitted to be initiated by anyone other than the elder Mashaik (the spiritual directors) of their own family. Khwaja Shams-ud_Din Ibrahim and his brother followed this tradition and obtained Khirqa-i-Wilayat-o-Khilafat (the patched authority and leadership) from their own father. They left their home at Chist with a mission to preach and teach the moral and spiritual Islamic rules. While his two brothers stayed at Pashin Quetta, Khwaja Shams-ud-Din Ibrahim traveled on to the valley of Mastung 50 km, away in the south of Quetta valley and selected a hillock called Safaid Bulandi (White height) for his dwelling. He had numerous Khulafa and a vast number of murids. But he himself trained and directly bestowed Khilafat upon his two sons (Khwaja Kalan was sajjada nashin as being the eldest) and four of his grandsons Khwaja Ahmed, Khwaja Ali, Khwaja Sultan Mohammad, Khwaja Ibrahim Dopasi.

 Khwaja Kala remained in Mastung.
 Khwaja Mir Haibat Khan went to the area of Sarlath and Shorawak (a place near Afghan border)
 Khwaja Ahmed was settled in Noshki.
 Khwaja Ali was sent to Kalat.
 Khwaja Sultan Mohammad proceeded to Mangovher and remained there.
 Khwaja Ibrahim Dopasi went to live at Dhader.

Apart from his sons and grandsons he had other deputies too, nominated by him to continue the "work". One of his favorite Khlifa was Nizam-Ud-Din. He often said, "if someone comes to me with the request to pray for him, he should first go to Nizam-ud-Din". The Khalifa's grave can be visited besides the tomb of his Murshid.  Syed Khawaja Ibrahim Yakpasi Chishti.

References

Mastung: Birds Eye View
 Baluchistan district gazetteer series, Volume 3
through the ages: selection from government record, Volume 2
 Balochistan District Gazeetteir series vol.9/12 page no 32
 Balochistan District Gazetteer series vol.9/12 page no 76
 Balochistan District Gazetteer series Directorate of Archives Quetta Vol 9/12 page no.76 and 346
 Balochistan District Gazetteer Series.1907  vol.9/12  page no.276
 Reference of Archive department file No.18/1906 Letter No. 7330 Dated 25 December 1901 of Major A.H.McMahon
 Ref Book:Khwaja Ibrahim Yakpassi Chishti by Professor Syed Ahmed Saeed Hamdani, Page 54 Yakpassi Trust Mastung-Balochistan
 Tazkara-e-Syed Moudodi, idara-e-maarife Islam, Mansoora Lahore
 Sair-ul-aolia, Urdu and Persian edition, written by Amir Khurd
 Maraat-ul-israr by Abdul Rehman Chishti Quds Sira
 Trirekh-e-mashaikh-e-Chisht by Doctor Inamu l-Haq
 Safinat-ul-Arifeen
 Tazkara-e-Ghuas o Qutub
 Shijra-e-Maoroosi Sadat Kirani
 The mashkiah of Chisht by Shaikh Muhammed Zakariyya Kandhalwi
 The Origin of the Chishti Order

1350s births
Indian Sufi saints
Indian Sufi religious leaders
Chishti Order
Year of death missing